Group 1 of the 1974 FIFA World Cup was contested between 14 and 22 June 1974. This group was played in West Berlin and Hamburg. The pool was composed of the tournament host nation West Germany (Pot 1-Western Europe), with East Germany (Pot 2-Eastern Europe), Chile (Pot 3-South America) and Australia (Pot 4-Rest of the world).

Standings

Matches
All times listed are local (CET)

West Germany vs Chile

East Germany vs Australia

Australia vs West Germany

Chile vs East Germany

Australia vs Chile

East Germany vs West Germany

See also
 East Germany–West Germany football rivalry

References

External sources
 West Germany-Chile, game report
 West Germany vs Chile - Game report
 E. Germany-W. Germany, game report
 Chile-East Germany, game report
 Chile vs East Germany - Game report
 East Germany-West Germany, game report
 Australia-Chile, game report
 Australia vs Chile - Game report

1974 FIFA World Cup
East Germany at the 1974 FIFA World Cup
West Germany at the 1974 FIFA World Cup
Chile at the 1974 FIFA World Cup
Australia at the 1974 FIFA World Cup